Pterolophia tuberculatithorax is a species of beetle in the family Cerambycidae. It was described by Maurice Pic in 1926.

References

tuberculatithorax
Beetles described in 1926